Télé Congo, derived from Télévision Congolaise, is the national television of the Republic of Congo. Founded 28 November 1962 it is the oldest television network in sub-Saharan Africa.

References

Television channels and stations established in 1962
Television stations in the Republic of the Congo
Multilingual broadcasters
French-language television stations
Television networks
Publicly funded broadcasters
State media